Charles William Walker may refer to:
 Charles Walker (cricketer, born 1851) (1851–1915), English cricketer
 Charlie Walker (Australian cricketer) (1909–1942), Australian wicket-keeper

See also
 Charles Walker (disambiguation)